Eicke is a German surname.  Notable people with the surname include:

Edna Eicke (1919–1979), American magazine illustrator
Hans Eicke (1884–1947), German Olympic athlete
Roberta Eike, American oceanographer and marine geologist
Theodor Eicke (1892–1943), German Nazi SS general and Holocaust perpetrator
Ulrich Eicke (born 1952), German canoer
Wels Eicke (1893–1980), Australian footballer

See also
Kampfgruppe Eicke, name of the 3rd SS Division Totenkopf (prior to achieving division status), named after Theodor Eicke

Surnames from given names
German-language surnames